Salmon Gargoyle is an outdoor 1987 sculpture by Wayne Chabre, installed in 1988 on the University of Oregon campus in Eugene, Oregon, in the United States. The hammered copper head of a salmon with Kwakiutl Indian representation on its sides, built on a stainless steel frame, measures approximately  x  x . It was surveyed and deemed "treatment needed" by the Smithsonian Institution's "Save Outdoor Sculpture!" program in March 1993. The sculpture is administered by the University of Oregon.

See also

 1987 in art

References

1987 sculptures
1988 establishments in Oregon
Animal sculptures in Oregon
Copper sculptures in Oregon
Fish in art
Outdoor sculptures in Eugene, Oregon
Sculptures by Wayne Chabre
Stainless steel sculptures in Oregon
University of Oregon campus